Adjud is a city in Vrancea County, Western Moldavia, Romania. It has a population of 14,670 inhabitants (2011). It lies at a railway junction which has a classification yard and a passenger station. Adjud, situated north of the point where the river Trotuș enters the Siret, used to be a marketplace.

The city administers three villages: Adjudu Vechi, Burcioaia and Șișcani.

Geography 
Adjud is situated on a plain and is surrounded by hills up to a height of 400 meters at the foot of the southern Carpathians. The average altitude of the town is 100 m above sea level. The surrounding land is favorable for agriculture.

Geological research findings show the city's subsoil having layers of gravel and sand Levantine and Quaternary, forming significant hydrological aquifers deposits fed by the Trotuș and Siret rivers and direct rainfalls.

The climate is temperate with annual average temperature of 8- and an average rainfall of 500 mm / m a year. It is characterized by prevailing northwinds with winds from the south and south-east in the hot season. Due to its location at the junction of the provinces Moldavia, Wallachia and Transylvania, it has been an important road and railway junction since ancient times. The town's area was of 5911 ha in 1997, out of which 105 ha was covered by buildings and yards.

History 

In the northern part of the town a settlement from the Bronze Age was discovered, which dates roughly from the second millennium BC and belongs to Monteoru culture. Geto-Dacian vestiges of 5th century BC were also found here.

The first mention of the town is made by its Hungarian name Egyedhalma (“in oppido nostro Egydhalm” meaning "in our city Gilles’ Hill") in a Latin language document from 1433, where Iliaș of Moldavia granted commercial privileges to Transylvanian Saxon merchants. The Romanian name of Adjud derives from the Hungarian one. The original name supports the idea that the town was established by Hungarian Csángós settled in Moldavia as part of a systematic Hungarian imperial policy to settle Hungarian and partly German population in places of strategic economic, commercial and military importance with the task to control and defend the eastern frontier of Hungary.

The Battle of Adjud occurred here on October 14, 1788, during the Russo-Turkish War (1787–1792), pitting the armies of the Russian Empire and the Habsburg monarchy (under the command of field marshal Baron Spleny von Mihald) against those of the Ottoman Empire.

Adjud was declared a city in 1948. In 1950 it became the residence of Adjud district from Putna Region, then (after 1952) from Bârlad Region and (after 1956) from the Bacău Region. In 1968, it became a city of Vrancea County, while in 2000 Adjud was declared a municipality.

Population 

According to the 2011 census, Adjud had a population of 14,670. The ethnic structure was:
 Romanians: 13,734 (93.62%)
 Roma: 915 (6.23%)
 Other ethnic groups: 0.09%

As to religious makeup, most respondents were of the Orthodox religion (94.92%). The second largest community was the Roman Catholic one, 2.32% of the population. Pentecostals totaled 1.33% while other denominations were represented by less than 1%.

Road 
Adjud municipality is crossed by National Road E 85 for a length of 11 km, from km 226 at the Trotuș River bridge up to km 237,  running through downtown for a section of 3 km. It is also crossed by the national road 11A, from the agro-food market towards Onești–Bacău, for a length of 4 km from km 37 + 450 to km 33 + 450. National Road E 85 branches out to Adjudu Vechi, while 11A goes to Bârlad, from km 42 to 46, for a length of 4 km, running in the downtown area for a section of 1.5 km.

Notable persons 
 Gheorghe Balș (1868–1934), engineer and art historian
 Dan Botta (1907–1958), poet, essayist
 Emil Botta (1911–1977), poet, writer and actor, brother of Dan Botta
 Minodora Cliveti (1955), politician
 Elena Dan (1967–1996), opera singer
 Ion Dichiseanu (1933-2021), actor
 Angela Gheorghiu (1965), soprano
 Nelly Miricioiu (1952), soprano

References

External links 

 Municipality website

Populated places in Vrancea County
Localities in Western Moldavia
Cities in Romania
Dacian towns